Hécourt may refer to the following places in France:

 Hécourt, Eure, a commune in the Eure department
 Hécourt, Oise, a commune in the Oise department